The 2017 UEC European Track Championships (under-23 & junior) was the 17th continental championships for European under-23 and junior track cyclists, and the 8th since the event was renamed following the reorganisation of European track cycling in 2010. The event took place at the Sangalhos Velodrome in Sangalhos, Portugal from 19 to 23 July 2017.

Medal summary

Under 23

Junior

Notes
 In junior competitions, individual pursuits are contested over 3km/2km for men/women respectively.
 Competitors named in italics contested the qualifying rounds only.
 In the qualifying round, Letizia Paternoster clocked a 2:20.927 WJR.

Medal table

References

External links
 Results website
 European Cycling Union

under
under-23
European Track Championships, 2017
2017 in Portuguese sport
International cycle races hosted by Portugal
Sport in Anadia, Portugal
July 2017 sports events in Europe